William Hoare (c. 1707–1792) was an English artist.

William Hoare may also refer to:

William Hoare (gymnast), British gymnast
William Hoare (cricketer, born 1847), English cricketer
William Hoare (cricketer, born 1868), Australian cricketer
William Henry Hoare (1809–1888), English cleric and author
William Hoare (physician) (died 1666)  on List of fellows of the Royal Society G, H, I

See also
William S. Hoar (1913–2006), professor of zoology 
William Hore (disambiguation)